Calshot Lifeboat Station is located on Calshot Spit near the village of Calshot, Hampshire, and is on the southern bank of the open end of Southampton Water, on the south coast of England. The station is owned and operated by the Royal National Lifeboat Institution (RNLI) and currently operates two inshore lifeboats. They are an  called  and a  called .

History 
Until its closure in 1961, Calshot Spit had been the site of Royal Air Force station RAF Calshot, which was the primary seaplane/flying boat development and training unit in the United Kingdom. After the departure of the RAF, Hampshire County Council opened an educational activities centre on the site, which was The centre was constantly being asked by HM Coastguard to use its boats to go out and rescue people in trouble off shore. The administrators of the centre decided that they would contact the RNLI with a view to there being a more formalised rescue service for this busy stretch of water. The RNLI spent a year evaluating this proposition and as a result opened a lifeboat station on the site in 1970.

1960–1985: early lifeboats 
The first lifeboat to be stationed at Calshot was a  Keith Nelson-type lifeboat made of fibreglass or glass-reinforced plastic. She was called  and had the operation number of 40-001. Although lacking in self-righting capability, she was viewed as a successful experiment in the use of fibreglass for lifeboats. She cost £24,559.

In the evening of 10 January 1976, during gale force 8 to 9 winds and a choppy sea the lifeboat Ernest Williams was called to help a small motorboat which had been driven ashore on salt marsh in the Ashlett Creek channel. As the water was too shallow for the lifeboat, the crew of the Ernest Williams waded through the marshes, dragging the lifeboat's inflatable boarding boat while they looked for the vessel. Eventually the vessel's three crewmen were located and rescued. The Calshot crew were awarded RNLI bronze medals for the difficult rescue.

The second lifeboat at the station was the  lifeboat , which was moored just off Calshot Castle. The crew used a davit-launched boarding boat when called out on service. Safeway, which was funded by and named for the Safeway supermarket chain, was built by Lochin Marine at Newhaven, East Sussex in 1985. Like the Ernest William she had a fibreglass hull but was self-righting due to her watertight cabin.

1996–2007: new facilities and lifeboats 
In 1996, the RNLI funded the construction of new shore facilities for Calshot Station, constructed on concrete stanchions to prevent flooding. Hampshire County Council provided a new boarding jetty for use jointly by the lifeboat station and the Calsholt Activity Centre.
The Safeway was withdrawn from service in December 2001 and replaced by the former Poole-based Brede Inner Wheel, which was itself replaced after only a few months by the  lifeboat . Margaret Russell Fraser had come across the Solent from Yarmouth Lifeboat Station on the Isle of Wight, where she had been a part of RNLI's relief fleet.

In 2003 the station was given its first  inshore lifeboat from the relief fleet. She was called . 2003 also saw improvements made to the station facilities. At the cost of £266,424 an extension was added to the side of the station.
Arun-class lifeboats were withdrawn from service in 2007.

2012–present: reorganisation 
In 2012, the Calshot board of trustees decided that Calshot would cease to be an all-weather station; consequently the Tyne-class lifeboat was withdrawn on 4 April. In its place an  inshore lifeboat was sent to the station, necessitating improved facilities had been made at the station to accommodate the new lifeboat and its required launch tractor, a new lifeboat arrived and the Alexander Coutanche was withdrawn. On 11 July the new Atlantic 85-class Max Walls was placed on the station along with a new New Holland Launch tractor and the Calsholt was officially re-designated as an inshore lifeboat station.

References 

 
Lifeboat stations in Hampshire